The Celebes longfin eel (Anguilla celebesensis) is an eel in the family Anguillidae. It was described by Johann Jakob Kaup in 1856. It is a tropical eel known from freshwaters in the Western Pacific, including Indonesia, the Philippines, New Guinea, and Western and American Samoa. The eels spend most of their lives in freshwater but migrate to the ocean to breed. Males can reach a maximum total length of 150 centimetres.

The Celebes longfin eel is minorly commercial in fisheries.

References

Anguillidae
Taxa named by Johann Jakob Kaup
Fish described in 1856
Near threatened animals